Alp Ozkilic, full name Alptekin Özkılıç (born March 27, 1986) is a Turkish-American mixed martial artist, who formerly competed as a Flyweight in the Ultimate Fighting Championship.

Background
Born and raised in Istanbul, Turkey, Özkılıç moved to the United States in 2004.  He attended Nassau Community College where he was a NJCAA All-American wrestler before transferring to Lindenwood University.

Mixed martial arts career
Özkılıç began his mixed martial arts career in 2010, competing mostly for regional promotions in his adopted Missouri and the central United States.  He compiled a record of 7-1 facing notable veterans Chico Camus and Antonio Banuelos before signing with the UFC in November 2013.

Ultimate Fighting Championship
Özkılıç made his promotional debut on December 14, 2013 at UFC on Fox 9 against Darren Uyenoyama, replacing an injured John Moraga. Özkılıç won the bout via split decision.

Özkılıç faced Louis Smolka on January 15, 2014 at UFC Fight Night 35. He lost the fight via unanimous decision.

Özkılıç faced John Lineker on July 16, 2014 at UFC Fight Night 45. Lineker defeated Özkılıç via third round TKO, in a bout that earned both participants Fight of the Night honors.

Özkılıç faced Ben Nguyen on May 10, 2015 at UFC Fight Night 65. He lost the fight via TKO in the first round.  Subsequently, Özkılıç was released from the organization.

Championships and achievements

Mixed martial arts
Ultimate Fighting Championship
Fight of the Night (One time)

Mixed martial arts record

|-
|Loss
|align=center|9–5
|Kwan Ho Kwak
|Decision (unanimous)
|Kunlun Fight - Cage Fight Series 5 / Top FC 11
|
|align=center|5
|align=center|5:00
|Seoul, South Korea
|
|-
|Loss
|align=center|9–4 
|Ben Nguyen
|KO (punches)
|UFC Fight Night: Miocic vs. Hunt
|
|align=center|1
|align=center|4:59
|Adelaide, Australia
|
|-
|Loss
|align=center| 9–3
|John Lineker
|TKO (punches)
|UFC Fight Night: Cowboy vs. Miller
|
|align=center|3
|align=center|4:51
|Atlantic City, New Jersey, United States
|
|-
|Loss
|align=center| 9–2
|Louis Smolka
|Decision (unanimous)
|UFC Fight Night: Rockhold vs. Philippou
|
|align=center|3
|align=center|5:00
|Duluth, Georgia, United States
|
|-
| Win
|align=center| 9–1
|Darren Uyenoyama
|Decision (split)
|UFC on Fox: Johnson vs. Benavidez 2
|
|align=center|3
|align=center|5:00
|Sacramento, California, United States
|
|-
| Win
|align=center| 8–1
| Antonio Banuelos
| TKO (punches)
| Legacy FC 20
|
|align=center| 1
|align=center| 0:30
|Corpus Christi, Texas, United States
|
|-
| Win
|align=center| 7–1
|Josh Robinson
| TKO (punches)
|Rumble Time Promotions: Rage on the River
|
|align=center|2
|align=center|4:00
|St. Charles, Missouri, United States
|
|-
| Win
|align=center| 6–1
|Ray Grindstaff
| Decision (unanimous)
| Rumble Time Promotions
|
|align=center|3
|align=center|5:00
|St. Charles, Missouri, United States
|
|-
| Loss
|align=center| 5–1
|Chico Camus
| Decision (unanimous)
| LOF 52: Tachi Tourney Semifinals
|
|align=center|3
|align=center|5:00
|Indianapolis, Indiana, United States
|
|-
| Win
|align=center| 5–0
|Andrew Huffman
| Decision (unanimous)
| LOF 51: Little Giants
|
|align=center|3
|align=center|5:00
|Indianapolis, Indiana, United States
|
|-
| Win
|align=center| 4–0
|Damian Jeffro
| Decision (unanimous)
|Fight Me MMA
|
|align=center|3
|align=center|5:00
|St. Charles, Missouri, United States
|
|-
| Win
|align=center| 3–0
|Bruce Sessman
| Submission (rear-naked choke)
|Premier Combat League: Cage Madness
|
|align=center|1
|align=center|0:49
|Glen Carbon, Illinois, United States
|
|-
| Win
|align=center| 2–0
|Sergio da Silva
| Decision (unanimous)
|Ring of Combat 34
|
|align=center|2
|align=center|5:00
|Atlantic City, New Jersey, United States
|
|-
| Win
|align=center| 1–0 
|Brandon Wood
| Decision (unanimous)
|Capital City Cage Wars
|
|align=center|3
|align=center|5:00
|St. Louis, Missouri, United States
|
|-

See also
 List of current UFC fighters
 List of male mixed martial artists

References

External links
 
 

Turkish emigrants to the United States#
American male mixed martial artists
Turkish male mixed martial artists
Mixed martial artists from Missouri
Mixed martial artists utilizing collegiate wrestling
Living people
Sportspeople from Istanbul
Lindenwood University alumni
1986 births
Nassau Community College alumni
Ultimate Fighting Championship male fighters
American male sport wrestlers
Amateur wrestlers